Burumakok is a minor Ok language of West Papua. Despite having just forty speakers, there is limited bilingualism and the language is not considered endangered.

It is spoken in Burumakok village, Kurima Subdistrict, Pegunungan Bintang Regency.

References

Languages of western New Guinea
Ok languages